The Nation of Hawaii is a group of Kānaka Maoli (Native Hawaiians) in favor of Hawaiian independence from the United States. It is formed by proponents of the Hawaiian sovereignty movement in resistance to what sovereignty advocates consider the occupation of Hawai’i by the United States.[1] The group was formed following the severance of a previous organization, the Ohana Council. It is headed by Dennis Pu‘uhonua "Bumpy" Kanahele,[2] who is the group's spokesperson and Head of State.[3]

Leadership 
The Nation of Hawai'i is led by Dennis Pu‘uhonua "Bumpy" Kanahele, who previously was a leader in the Ohana Council. He is also the CEO of Aloha First, an organization dedicated to economic, social, and cultural education.

Kanahele made headlines again in 1995 when his group gave sanctuary to Nathan Brown, a Native Hawaiian activist who had refused to pay federal taxes in protest against the US presence in Hawaiʻi. Kanahele was arrested for interfering with U.S. marshals seeking to arrest a federal fugitive, convicted, and sentenced to eight months in federal prison, along with a probation period in which he was barred from the puʻuhonua and from participation in his sovereignty efforts.[2]

History

Apology Resolution 
On November 23, 1993, President Clinton signed the "Apology Resolution," which acknowledges that while Hawai'i was occupied by the United States, their sovereignty was never relinquished. This resolution was the first of its kind that acknowledged this history. This empowered leaders and organizers of the Nation of Hawai'i to reclaim the physical ownership of their Native land as well as their independence from the United States' annexation of the islands. Given that Native Hawaiians now had a legal document stating that they had not relinquished their sovereignty to the U.S., they were empowered to reclaim this through their various efforts.

Occupations at Makapu'u and Kaupo Beach 
In 1989 a homeless group of Kanaka Maoli lived on the beach surrounding the Makapuʻu lighthouse on Oʻahu. This beach was across from Sea Life Park in Hawai'i. Tourists coming to the water park in Hawai'i got nervous about the homeless camp displaying upside-down flags and signs saying that this is not America. The camp was fore-fronted by “Bumpy” Kanahele, who has rights to the land as a descendant of the Kamehameha bloodline, and used his own money to go to Sears in Hawai'i to purchase tents for families to live in. The occupation at Makapu’u lasted for 15 months. It eventually ended with the state granting the homeless group roughly 45 acres of land that became known as “the Refuge of Waimanalo.”

In 1993 its members occupied Kaupo Beach, near Makapuʻu. This was another attempt to be granted land that could be run under sovereignty from the U.S. Government.

Risks to land ownership 
The group nearly lost its land several times, due both to sentiment fostered by activists opposing the Hawaiian sovereignty movement, and questions regarding rent and liability insurance. As of 2006, however, it was still home to at least forty people.

Way of living 
In addition to being an organization, the members of the Nation of Hawaii reside on the land they were granted by the state. They make several attempts to remain detached from the larger community of Hawai’i. Many would describe their style of living as “off the grid.” Their access to power and water is limited considering they do not outsource from state regulated companies.

References

External links 
 
 https://www.un.org/development/desa/indigenouspeoples/wp-content/uploads/sites/19/2016/08/Nation_of_Hawaii.pdf

Politics of Hawaii
Organizations based in Hawaii
Hawaiian sovereignty movement